Silknet JSC is a telecommunication company in Georgia, and a subsidiary of Silk Road Group.

Silknet delivers various telecom services to more than one million customers across the whole country. Silknet is the largest telecommunication company in Georgia and the entire Caucasus region. Silknet provides mobile communication (branches: Geocell and S1), cable internet (branches:  SilkOptic and DSL), wireless internet, IPTV (branch Silk TV), OTT Streaming TV (Silk-TV Digital), wireless fixed telephony, cable fixed telephony (VoIP, OTT), Satellite TV service (branch: Global TV). Silknet's main local competitors are MagtiCom, New Net and Beeline.

In 2018, Silknet acquired Geocell. This was the largest acquisition of a company in Georgia.

See also
MagtiCom
Geocell

References

Telecommunications companies of Georgia (country)
Telecommunications companies established in 2010
Companies based in Tbilisi
Brands of Georgia (country)